BR-304 is a Brazilian federal highway that begins in Beberibe, Ceará and ends in Natal, Rio Grande do Norte. The highway also serves the municipalities of Aracati in Ceará and Mossoró, Lajes and Parnamirim in Rio Grande do Norte.

References

Federal highways in Brazil